Catapaecilma nakamotoi is a butterfly of the family Lycaenidae first described by Hisakazu Hayashi in 1979.

It is a rare species, endemic to the island of Mindanao in the southern Philippines.

Its forewing length is 17–19 mm.

References

 Hayashi, Hisakazu (1979). "New Lycaenid Butterflies from Mindanao, the Philippines". Tyô to Ga. 30 (1,2): 83-90.
 (1995). "Checklist of the butterflies of the Philippine Islands (Lepidoptera: Rhopalocera)". Nachrichten des Entomologischen Vereins Apollo. Suppl. 14: 7-118.

  (2012). "Revised checklist of the butterflies of the Philippine Islands (Lepidoptera: Rhopalocera)". Nachrichten des Entomologischen Vereins Apollo. Suppl. 20: 1-64.

Lepidoptera of the Philippines
Endemic fauna of the Philippines
Fauna of Mindanao
Butterflies described in 1979
Catapaecilma